Fairfield East is a suburb of Sydney, in the state of New South Wales, Australia. Fairfield East is part of the Greater Western Sydney region. Fairfield East shares the postcode of 2165 with nearby suburbs of Fairfield, Fairfield Heights and Fairfield West.

History
Fairfield East gets its name from its neighbour Fairfield which in turn was named after the family estate of Captain John Horsley, an early settler. Prior to colonisation, the Cabrogal clan of the Dharug people inhabited the area around what is now known as Fairfield East. British settlers moved into the area in the early 19th century and used the land for farming.

By the 1870s, the area now known as Fairfield East was part of two large properties: Orchardleigh in the north which extended towards Guildford and Mark Lodge in the south which also included Villawood, Carramar and parts of the Fairfield town centre.

In 1876, Orchardleigh was subdivided for housing and when Mark Lodge followed suit in 1885, the area completed its transformation from farmland to suburbia. The name Mark Lodge was still used in the area for some time after although by the 1950s it had officially become Fairfield East.

Commercial area
One-fourth of the suburb comprises large industrial area. There a few shopfronts on Tangerine Street and a BP petrol station on The Horsley Drive.

Located in the adjacent suburb of Villawood, Bunnings Warehouse in Woodville Road, a gymnasium, a McDonald's outlet and an auto repair are proximate to the eastern part of Fairfield East.

Crime
Fairfield East was home to the infamous Villawood Bronx which was plagued with crime and drugs and experienced gang related murders and other serious crimes for many years until the former public housing estate was knocked down in 1999 and redeveloped into townhouses and private homes.

Population
According to the 2016 census, Fairfield East had a population of 5,273 people. 39.4% of people were born in Australia. The next most common countries of birth were Vietnam 18.9%, Iraq 6.2%, Lebanon 3.6% and China 3.3%.  19.3% of people spoke only English at home. Other languages spoken at home included Vietnamese 24.7%, Arabic 17.6%, Cantonese 4.6%, Mandarin 3.5% and Spanish 2.5%. The most common responses for religion were Catholic 22.0%, Buddhism 20.1%, Islam 18.0% and No Religion 12.7%.

The most common occupations included labourers 16.1%, professionals 14.5%, technicians and trades workers 14.2%, clerical and administrative workers 13.2%, and machinery operators and drivers 13.2%.

References

Suburbs of Sydney
City of Fairfield